= Deutsches Geodätisches Forschungsinstitut =

Research institute in Germany

The Deutsches Geodätisches Forschungsinstitut (German Geodetic Research Institute), commonly abbreviated as "DGFI", is a research institute located in Munich, Germany, dedicated to the study of Geodesy. It was established in 1951, and operates under the auspices of the Bavarian Academy of Sciences and Humanities.
